John Murrell may refer to:

 John Murrell (bandit) (1806–1844), American river bandit
 John Murrell (chemist) (1932–2016), British theoretical chemist
 John Murrell (playwright) (1945–2019), American-born Canadian playwright

See also
Jack Murrell, Australian footballer